S.D.V. College of Arts and Applied Science, or Sanatana Dharma Vidyasala College, is an educational institution based in Sanathanapuram, Alappuzha, India, affiliated to the University of Kerala and recognised by the government of Kerala.

It is a self-financing educational institution, under the Sanatana Dharma Vidyasala and was established in 2013. It is the sixth educational institution that came into existence under the Sanatana Dharma Vidyasala, a non-profit making organization registered under the Companies Act, which owns and manages the Sanatana Dharma College, SDV High School for Girls, SDV High School for Boys, SDV English Medium HSS (CBSE), and SDV Boys’ HSS.

The institution offers graduate courses in B.Com Tourism & Travel Management, B.Sc. Bio-Technology (Multi-Major) and B.A. Journalism, Mass Communication and Video Production under the Choice Based Credit and Semester System (CBCSS) of the University of Kerala.

Courses 
Admission to courses is based on the rules and regulations set by the University of Kerala and the government of Kerala. Fifty percent of strength is filled on merit and the remaining is reserved for candidates chosen by the Managing Committee. Admission dates are decided and announced by the University of Kerala. Admission to undergraduate courses falls during May–June every year.
 B.Com (Tourism and Travel Management)
 BA Journalism, Mass Communication and Video Production
 B.Sc Biotechnology (multi-major)

References

Colleges in Kerala
Colleges affiliated to the University of Kerala
Universities and colleges in Alappuzha district
Educational institutions established in 2013
2013 establishments in Kerala